Oggiono is a comune (municipality) in the Province of Lecco in the Italian region Lombardy, located about  northeast of Milan and about  southwest of Lecco.
 

The municipality of Oggiono contains the frazioni (subdivisions, mainly villages and hamlets) Bagnolo, Imberido, Laguccio, Miravalle and Peslago.

Oggiono borders the following municipalities: Annone di Brianza, Dolzago, Ello, Galbiate, Molteno and Sirone.

Lago di Annone is located on its borders.

It was the eponymous birthplace of the renaissance painter Marco d'Oggiono, a chief pupil of Leonardo da Vinci.

Demographic evolution

Twin towns — sister cities
Oggiono is twinned with:

  Leisnig, Germany 
  Halásztelek, Hungary

References

External links
 www.comune.oggiono.lc.it/

Cities and towns in Lombardy